President Casino Laclede's Landing was a stationary riverboat casino in Saint Louis, Missouri owned by Pinnacle Entertainment.

History 
The President Casino opened in 1994 on the SS Admiral shortly after Missouri legalized riverboat casinos. When it opened, it included 100 table games and 150 video poker machines within its 70,000 square feet of gaming space, as early gaming regulations required games to be of skill. It was owned by the now-defunct President Casinos which had other riverboat casinos in the mid-1990s. Isle of Capri Casinos attempted to buy the President Casino unsuccessfully, but later, Pinnacle Entertainment bought the property for $46 million. The deal, completed on December 21, 2006, occurred at the same time Pinnacle was building its Lumière Place casino just adjacent to the President.

The casino was part of Pinnacle's two-casino Lumiere Place complex at Laclede's Landing (although Pinnacle in 2008 was reported to be considering moving it north to the Chain of Rocks Bridge). The  casino featured 756 slots and twenty table games.

On June 24, 2010 the President Casino closed for good. Due to poor performance, the Missouri Gaming Commission had wanted to revoke its license, and eventually Pinnacle Entertainment decided to move on. It actually closed earlier than expected, due to flooding on the Mississippi River at the time.

The boat itself, the former SS Admiral, was cut up and sold for scrap after no buyer came forward.

References

External links
President Casino St. Louis (archived)

Buildings and structures in St. Louis
Casinos in Missouri
Defunct riverboat casinos
Pinnacle Entertainment
Casinos completed in 1994
1994 establishments in Missouri
2010 disestablishments in Missouri
Former buildings and structures in St. Louis